Raymundo Lara is an American politician and educator, currently serving as a member of the New Mexico House of Representatives from the 34th district, which includes [[San Miguel, La Mesa, Chamberino, La Union, Santa Teresa, and Sunland Park in Doña Ana County.

Education 
Lara earned a Bachelor of Arts degree from New Mexico State University.

Career 
Prior to entering politics, Lara spent 17 years in K-12 education and worked as the program coordinator for the Gadsden Independent Schools. In 2018, Lara defeated incumbent Democrat Bealquin "Bill" Gomez and took office on January 15, 2019. He is a member of the Democratic Party. In the New Mexico House, Lara serves on the Education Committee and Agriculture & Water Resources Committee.

References 

Hispanic and Latino American state legislators in New Mexico
Democratic Party members of the New Mexico House of Representatives
New Mexico State University alumni
Educators from New Mexico
Year of birth missing (living people)
Living people